Mark William McPhee (25 January 1964 – 15 August 1999) was an Australian cricketer who played for Western Australia from 1984 to 1999.

Career
Having previously attended the Western Australian Institute of Sport and played for the Western Australia under-19 cricket team, McPhee made his first-class debut for Western Australia against Victoria in November 1984, scoring 85 runs from 127 balls batting at number five before being dismissed by Merv Hughes. Playing almost exclusively as an opening batsman, McPhee recorded two centuries in his first-class career, with a highest score of 135. In total, McPhee scored 1699 runs in 40 first-class games at an average of 27.85, and 594 runs in 17 limited overs games at an average of 37.12, with a highest score of 97.

In August 1999, McPhee was killed when a truck collided with his four-wheel drive near Gingin. The Mark McPhee Memorial Trophy was established by the Fremantle and North Perth Cricket Clubs, the two teams he played for in the Western Australian Grade Cricket competition.

References

1964 births
1999 deaths
Australian cricketers
People from Katanning, Western Australia
Western Australia cricketers
Western Australian Institute of Sport alumni
Cricketers from Western Australia
Road incident deaths in Western Australia
Truck road incident deaths